RenderX, Inc is a commercial software development company that provides standards-based software products, used for typeset-quality electronic and print output of business content. RenderX develops products that convert XML content into printable formats such as PDF, PostScript and AFP.

History 

RenderX started as a company to promote open standards in general and XSL-FO in particular, participating in a contest announced by Sun and Adobe. Later the contest was cancelled but the company decided to proceed anyway.

Contribution to XSL-FO community 

The company has devised a DTD for XSL-FO documents and holds three patents of converting XML to PDF. RenderX is one of the 335 members of the World Wide Web Consortium and a contributor to OASIS.

Products 

RenderX's main product is a Java-based XSL-FO formatting engine called XEP, which converts XSL-FO documents to printable form (PDF or PostScript). XEP is free for academic and personal use.

XEP conforms to Extensible Stylesheet Language (XSL), a W3C recommendation. It also supports a subset of the Scalable Vector Graphics (SVG).

References

External links 
RenderX corporate website
Use the flexibility of XEP to render and publish XML presentations

World Wide Web Consortium
Software companies based in California
American companies established in 1999
Companies based in Palo Alto, California
Software companies of the United States